Sinkkonen is a Finnish surname. Notable people with the surname include:

 Yrjö Sinkkonen (1909–1972), Finnish farmer and politician
 Sauli Sinkkonen (born 1989), Finnish volleyball player

Finnish-language surnames
Surnames of Finnish origin